Robbie Buhl (born September 2, 1963) is an American former race car driver who competed in the Indy Racing League. He was a color commentator for the IndyCar races on Versus. In 2016, Robbie, along with his brother Tom Buhl, started Buhl Sport Detroit, a motorsports marketing company, professional race team, and teen driving program based in Detroit, MI.

Buhl's current race team, Racing4Detroit, is the first professional race team based in Detroit, and most recently ran in the 2019 Americas Rallycross Championship. He also created and acts as lead instructor of Teen Street Skills, an advanced teen driver training program also based and operating in Detroit.

He won the 1992 Indy Lights championship and caught the eye of John Menard's Team Menard in 1996, running as team mate to Tony Stewart for two seasons succeeding the late Scott Brayton.  He scored his first win in what was once the closest finish in series history when he beat ex-MasterCard Lola F1 driver Vincenzo Sospiri by 0.064 seconds at the New Hampshire International Speedway.

Personal life
Buhl's wife Becky is the widow of former racer Scott Brayton.

Buhl was born in Detroit but his home is Grosse Pointe Farms, Michigan. He is a graduate of Cranbrook School (now Cranbrook Kingswood School) in Bloomfield Hills. His family's wealth stems from 19th/early 20th century manufacturing and real estate development and the industrialization of Detroit in the period 1850-1950.  Family holdings included Buhl Stamping, Buhl Aircraft Company, development of vast real estate holdings (including the landmark Buhl Building in downtown Detroit), Parke-Davis (now part of drug giant Pfizer), Buhl Steel (now part of U.S. Steel), Copper and Brass Sales, Inc, (by marriage) and many other holdings. Relatives include former Detroit mayors Christian H. Buhl and Frederick Buhl. His parents reside in Grosse Pointe Farms, Harbor Springs, Michigan, and Hobe Sound, Florida.

Robbie is a Founder and key Supporter of "Racing for Kids", a charitable foundation established to assist chronically ill children. Robbie makes a point of visiting sick children at hospitals on each stop of the circuit, bringing a bit of cheer to their lives in the process.

In 2007, he began a broadcasting career, joining the broadcast booth for the Indy Pro Series, now the Firestone Indy Lights Series, alongside veteran broadcaster Bob Jenkins. He would join Jenkins and Jon Beekhuis in the Versus broadcast booth for the 2009 IndyCar Series. It was announced on the Izod Indycar Series website he was let go by Versus for the network's IndyCar coverage and will be replaced by Wally Dallenbach Jr., who is also a color commentator for TNT's NASCAR coverage.

Career results

American Open Wheel Racing results
(key) (Races in bold indicate pole position)

American Racing Series / Indy Lights

CART

IRL IndyCar Series

Indianapolis 500

References

External links
Driver DB Profile

1963 births
Living people
Champ Car drivers
Cranbrook Educational Community alumni
IndyCar Series drivers
Indianapolis 500 drivers
IndyCar Series team owners
Indy Lights champions
Indy Lights drivers
SCCA Formula Super Vee drivers
Motorsport announcers
Trans-Am Series drivers
Racing drivers from Detroit
Barber Pro Series drivers
People from Grosse Pointe Farms, Michigan
Dreyer & Reinbold Racing drivers
Dale Coyne Racing drivers
A. J. Foyt Enterprises drivers
RFK Racing drivers